Rock Forge is an unincorporated community in Monongalia County, West Virginia, United States.

Rock Forge got its start in 1796 when a blast furnace opened at the site.

References 

Unincorporated communities in West Virginia
Unincorporated communities in Monongalia County, West Virginia